is a Jōdo-shū Buddhist temple in the Chitose neighborhood of the city of Kameoka, Kyoto, Japan. It claims to be the successor to one of the  provincial temples established by Emperor Shōmu during the Nara period (710–794). Due to this connection, the foundation stones of the Nara period temple now located to the south of the present day complex were designated as a National Historic Site in 1928 with the area under protection extended in 2006.

History
These temples were built to a semi-standardized template, and served both to spread Buddhist orthodoxy to the provinces, and to emphasize the power of the Nara period centralized government under the Ritsuryō system.

The Tanba Kokubun-ji is located is located on an alluvial fan to the east of the Oi River in the Kameoka Basin. This area was the center of ancient Tanba Province, and in the near vicinity is the Chitose Kurumazuka Kofun and the ichinomiya of the province, the Izumo-daijingū. The exact date of its construction is unknown but it is believed to be at the end of the Nara period from excavated roof tiles. Per excavations conducted from 1982 to1987, the temple occupied a square compound, 218 meters on each side. The layout of buildings was based on Hokki-ji in Ikaruga, Nara and consisted of a   Kondō and Pagoda side by side, surrounded by a cloister with a Middle Gate, Lecture Hall, and monks quarters. The main hall measured 15.8 by 11.6 meters, and was perhaps a five by four bay structure. The Pagoda was seven-story structure, 15.7 meters on each side. All of its 17 foundation stones have survived. The Lecture Hall overlaps the site of the current temple's Main Hall. It measured 26.8 by 14.9 meters and was a seven by four bay structure.  From the style of roof tiles, it appears that the temple was reconstructed at the beginning of the Heian period and again towards the end of the Heian period.

The temple was destroyed by Akechi Mitsuhide during the Sengoku period, and the existing main hall, Belfry and Sanmon were rebuilt in 1774 and are all Kameoka City Important Cultural Properties. The Main Hall houses the main image, a statue of Yakushi Nyōrai, which dates from the late Heian period. 

In the exclave to the northeast of the temple is the ruins of a Hachiman Shrine, which is considered to be the guardian shrine of the Kokubun-ji. It is also included within the National Historic Site designation.

Cultural Properties

National Important Cultural Properties
, late Heian period, designated a national Important Cultural Property in 1917.

Gallery

See also
List of Historic Sites of Japan (Kyoto)
provincial temple

References

External links

Kameoka city home page
Kameoka city tourist information

Buddhist temples in Kyoto Prefecture
Historic Sites of Japan
Kameoka, Kyoto
Tanba Province
Important Cultural Properties of Japan
8th-century establishments in Japan
Nara period
8th-century Buddhist temples
Pure Land temples
Buddhist archaeological sites in Japan